Tilga may refer to several places in Estonia:

Tilga, Hiiu County, village in Emmaste Parish, Hiiu County
Tilga, Tartu County, village in Rõngu Parish, Tartu County